The Nineteen-Day Fast is a nineteen-day period of the year during which members of the Baháʼí Faith adhere to a sunrise-to-sunset fast. Along with obligatory prayer, it is one of the greatest obligations of a Baháʼí, and its chief purpose is spiritual: to reinvigorate the soul and bring the person closer to God.  The fast was instituted by the Báb, and accepted by Baháʼu'lláh, the founder of the Baháʼí Faith, who stated its rules in his book of laws, the Kitáb-i-Aqdas.  The nineteen days of fasting occur immediately after Ayyam-i-Ha, which celebrates the four or five intercalary days of the Baháʼí calendar dedicated to giving generously to the needy to prepare for the upcoming month of restraint. The Baháʼí faith commemorates the conclusion of the fast at the festival of Naw Ruz, or the Baháʼí New Year, on the vernal equinox (19–21 March, depending on the year).

In 2023, the first day of fasting was March 2 and the last was March 20.

History
The Báb, the founder of the Bábí Faith, instituted the Badíʻ calendar with 19 months of 19 days in his book the Persian Bayán, and stated that the last month would be a period of fasting. The Báb stated that the true significance of the fast was abstaining from all except the love of the Messengers from God.  The Báb also stated that the continuation of the fast was contingent of the approval of a messianic figure, Him Whom God Shall Make Manifest. Baháʼu'lláh, the founder of the Baháʼí Faith, who claimed to be the one foretold by the Báb, accepted the fast, but altered many of its details and regulations.

The Baháʼí fast resembles fasting practices of several other religions. Lent is a period of fasting for Christians, Yom Kippur and many other holidays for Jews, and the fast of Ramadan is practiced by Muslims. The Baháʼí fasting most resembles the fast of Ramadan, except that the period of fasting is defined as a fixed Baháʼí month, whereas Muslims fast during a lunar month, whose specific Gregorian dates vary from year to year.

Definition
Baháʼu'lláh established the guidelines of the fast in the Kitáb-i-Aqdas, his book of laws. Fasting is observed from sunrise to sunset during the Baháʼí month of ʻAlaʼ (between 1/2 March through 19/20 March) and it is the complete abstention from food, and drink. Observing the fast is an individual obligation, and is binding on all Baháʼís who have reached the age 15 until the age of 70; it is not enforceable by the Baháʼí administrative institutions. Various exemptions are given to the sick, the travelling, and others (see below).

While Baháʼís are allowed to fast at other times during the year, fasting at other times is not encouraged and is rarely done; Baháʼu'lláh permitted the making of vows to fast, which was a Muslim practice, but he stated that he preferred that such vows be "directed to such objectives as will profit mankind."

Spiritual nature
Along with obligatory prayer, it is one of the greatest obligations of a Baháʼí and is intended to bring the person closer to God. Shoghi Effendi, the head of the Baháʼí Faith in the first half of the 20th century, explains that the fast "is essentially a period of meditation and prayer, of spiritual recuperation, during which the believer must strive to make the necessary readjustments in his inner life, and to refresh and reinvigorate the spiritual forces latent in his soul. Its significance and purpose are, therefore, fundamentally spiritual in character. Fasting is symbolic, and a reminder of abstinence from selfish and carnal desires."

Fasting impact 
The Baháʼí fast challenges the physical body to enrich the soul. It teaches self-restraint as well as detachment from material needs. Additionally, fasting aids in developing empathy toward the impoverished and malnourished. The nineteen-day practice of intermittent fasting has numerous health benefits, including accelerated weight loss, reduced neurodegeneration, improved cognitive function, prevention of heart diseases and cancers, and increased longevity. These benefits are attributable to glucose and food deprivation, resulting in the body tapping into stored fat for energy. When the human body operates on energy stored in fat, it goes into ketosis. In turn, Metabolic processes increase significantly, leading to a greater rate of caloric efficiency. Behaviorally, the fast increases feelings of self-efficacy and mindfulness while decreasing feelings of fatigue, stress, and anxiety. Ultimately, the fast has several benefits, but people with compromised health should consult a doctor regarding any concerns before attempting it.

Laws concerning fasting
There are laws and practices associated with the Nineteen Day Fast that were established by Baháʼu'lláh in the Kitáb-i-Aqdas, his book of laws.

The period of fasting begins with the termination of the Intercalary Days and ends with the festival of Naw-Rúz.
Abstinence from food, drink and smoking from sunrise to sunset.
Fasting is obligatory for men and women once they attain the age of 15.
If one eats unconsciously during the fasting hours, this is not breaking the fast as it is an accident.
In regions of extremely high latitude where the duration of days and nights vary considerably, the times of the fast are fixed by the clock.
Missed days of fasting is not required to be made up later.
There is no mention of abstention from sexual relations while fasting.
Although this is not an explicit law, participants of the fast should refrain from profane language and gossiping. The faith believes gossiping damages all the souls involved.

Exemptions from fasting
There are various exemptions provided in the Kitáb-i-Aqdas from the obligation of fasting. One meeting the exemptions may, however, still choose to fast if they so wish, with the exception of the ill.  Baha'u'llah has stated that in "time of ill health it is not permissible to observe these obligations..."  The Universal House of Justice has counseled the Baha'is that the decision of whether or not to observe an applicable exemption should be made with wisdom, keeping in mind that the exemptions were set down with good reason.  Regarding those engaged in heavy labour Baha'u'llah has stated, "it is most commendable and fitting to eat with frugality and in private."

Those who are ill.
Those who are younger than 15 or older than 70.
Those who are engaged in heavy labour.
Women who are pregnant.
Women who are nursing.
Women who are menstruating (instead they must perform an ablution and recite the verse Glorified be God, the Lord of Splendour and Beauty 95 times a day).

Exemptions are also given to those travelling during the fast. Exemptions are given when the travel is longer than 9 hours (or 2 hours if travelling by foot). If the traveller breaks their journey for more than nineteen days, they are only exempt from fasting for the first three days. Also if they return home, they must begin fasting right away.

Gregorian dates

See also
 Baháʼí laws
 Health effects of fasting

References

Further reading
Herrmann, Duane L. (1988). Fasting: The Sun and Its Moons – a Baháʼí Handbook. George Ronald, Oxford. . 121 pp.
 Koppold-Liebscher DA, Klatte C, Demmrich S, Schwarz J, Kandil FI, Steckhan N, Ring R, Kessler CS, Jeitler M, Koller B, Ananthasubramaniam B, Eisenmann C, Mähler A, Boschmann M, Kramer A and Michalsen A (2021). Effects of Daytime Dry Fasting on Hydration, Glucose Metabolism and Circadian Phase: A Prospective Exploratory Cohort Study in Bahá'í Volunteers. Frontiers in Nutrition 8:662310. doi: 10.3389/fnut.2021.662310.

External links
BBC report on the Nineteen Day Fast
US Baháʼí site about the Nineteen Day Fast
The Importance of Obligatory Prayer and Fasting – a compilation from the Baháʼí writings, compiled by the Research Department of the Universal House of Justice
Baháʼí Prayers for the Fast

Bahá'í holy days
Fasting
March observances